Druva Inc. is a privately-held software company based in Santa Clara, California. The company provides SaaS-based data protection and management products. The company was founded in 2008, raised several rounds of funding, and grew to more than 800 employees.

History 

In 2008, Jaspreet Singh (CEO), Milind Borate (CTO), and Ramani Kothandaraman, who met working together at Veritas Software, founded Druva in Pune, India. In Sanskrit, "druva" translates to "North Star". Initially, Druva focused on providing data management software to financial companies before shifting to general enterprise data management.

In 2010, the company received Series A funding. In 2011, the company added smartphone support for its inSync app and received Series B funding. The next year, the company moved its headquarters to Silicon Valley, and again shifted focus to cloud-based data management and protection.  By 2013, the company had grown 194 employees. The company raised Series C funding the same year.

In 2014, Druva released its Phoenix server backup product and received Series D funding.
By 2016, the company had grown to 400 employees, and set up a subsidiary in Japan and an office in Tokyo. Druva received more funding and FedRAMP authority to operate in 2017. In 2019, Druva grew to 750 employees and more than 4,000 customers, and opened an office in Singapore. The company also received additional late-stage funding, which brought its total amount invested to $328 million and its total valuation to more than $1 billion.

In 2018, Druva acquired Letterkenny-based CloudRanger, a back-up and disaster recovery company. In 2019, Druva acquired CloudLanes to supplement its on-premises to cloud performance. The following year it acquired sfApex, a Texas based backup and migration company focused on Salesforce data. In April 2021, Druva raised $147 million in its eighth funding round, valuing the company at about $2 billion.

Products 

Druva creates and sells data protection and management products.

All of Druva's products operate on same cloud-native backup platform built on Amazon Web Services that provides a centralized backup repository.

Druva is focused on storing data in backups and managing those backups for servers, Software-as-a-Service applications, and cloud-based software. For example, in 2018 it introduced features that restore computer systems compromised by ransomware and specialized technology for backups of SQL servers, Azure directories, and network-attached storage.

References

External links 
 

Software companies based in the San Francisco Bay Area

Technology companies established in 2008

Companies based in Sunnyvale, California
Computer security companies
2008 establishments in Maharashtra